The 2009–10 season was the 105th season of competitive football in Turkey.

Overview
Bursaspor became league champions for the first time in club history, as well as the second club outside of Istanbul to win the Süper Lig. Fenerbahçe were runners-up, while Galatasaray finished third. Diyarbakırspor, Denizlispor, and Ankaraspor were relegated. Ariza Makukula, on loan at Kayserispor from S.L. Benfica, finished top scorer with 21 goals. The season started with the Turkish Super Cup between Fenerbahçe (Turkish Cup runners-up) and Beşiktaş (Turkish Cup winners). Fenerbahçe won the match two to nil, with Alex scoring both goals. Fenerbahçe and Galatasaray started out in pole position in the league by winning each of their first six matches. Beşiktaş did not fare as well as the other two Istanbul giants, winning one match, drawing three times, and losing twice. Eventual champions Bursaspor held seventh place six weeks into the season. The club found themselves in third place at the winter break, with Fenerbahçe and Galatasaray in first and second respectively. Kayserispor also held first place for a brief period of two weeks before the winter break started.

Fenerbahçe hit a wall after the winter break, falling to fourth place by the 25th week. This allowed Bursaspor to rise to the top of the table, a position they held for seven consecutive weeks from 8 March to 19 April. Fenerbahçe took back first place by the 31st week of the season. Entering the last match-day, the club sat a point above second placed Bursaspor. In order to win the league, Fenerbahçe had to either win outright against Trabzonspor, or draw while Bursaspor either draws or loses to Beşiktaş. Bursaspor won 2–1, while Fenerbahçe drew 1–1, unable to recover from Burak Yılmaz's first half goal. Galatasaray finished third due to their positive head-to-head record against Beşiktaş. Bursaspor qualified for the group stage of the Champions League for the first time in club history. The club had previously competed in the 1974–75 and 1986–87 European Cup Winners' Cup, as well as the 1995 UEFA Intertoto Cup.

The 2009–10 Turkish Cup started on 2 September 2009, with group stage matches taking place during the winter break. Defending champions Beşiktaş were drawn into Group D alongside İstanbul B.B., Manisaspor, Kasımpaşa, and Konya Şekerspor. The club were unable to progress past the group stages after finishing fourth with three points. Meanwhile, Fenerbahçe, Bursaspor, Manisaspor, Denizlispor, Antalyaspor, Galatasaray, İstanbul B.B., and Trabzonspor progressed to the quarter-finals. Trabzonspor and Fenerbahçe met in the final at Şanlıurfa GAP Stadium on 5 May 2010. Trabzonspor won the final 3–1. The win marked Trabzonspor's eighth Turkish Cup trophy, tied for second most with Beşiktaş. It was also the ninth time Fenerbahçe lost in the final of the Turkish Cup. Arif Çoban of Tokatspor and Umut Bulut of Trabzonspor finished joint top scorers with seven goals each.

Ankaraspor were removed from the Süper Lig on 17 September 2009. The Turkish Football Federation released the following statement: "The Professional Football Disciplinary Committee (PFDK) decided to relegate Ankaraspor by one division over its relationship with Ankaragücü, ruling that it was contrary to sporting competitiveness." Ahmet Gökçek, son of Melih Gökçek, the mayor of Ankara and also honorary chairman of Ankaraspor, quit his post at Ankaraspor and was elected chairman of Ankaragücü soon after. He, along with Ankaraspor chairman Ruhi Kurnaz, were banned from the game for six months.

Karabükspor won the 1.Lig and Bucaspor finished second, earning successive promotions. In the 2.Lig, Güngören Belediyespor were crowned champions, with Akhisar Belediyespor and TKİ Tavşanlı Linyitspor also being promoted. Bandırmaspor won the 3.Lig, while Balıkesirspor finished second and Malatya Belediyespor won the promotion play-offs.

In continental competition, Beşiktaş and Sivasspor took part in the UEFA Champions League, while Fenerbahçe, Galatasaray, and Trabzonspor took part in the Europa League. Beşiktaş were drawn into Group B alongside Manchester United F.C., PFC CSKA Moscow, and VfL Wolfsburg. They finished last in the group with four points. Sivasspor were knocked out of the Champions League by R.S.C. Anderlecht in the second qualifying round, and were ousted out of the Europa League by reigning champions FC Shakhtar Donetsk in the first round.

Fenerbahçe made it to the group stages of the Europa League after defeating Budapest Honvéd FC and FC Sion. They were drawn into Group H alongside FC Twente, Sheriff Tiraspol, and Steaua București. The club finished first in the group, but lost to Lille OSC 2–3 on aggregate in the first knockout round. Galatasaray were drawn alongside Panathinaikos, Dinamo București, and Sturm Graz. They also finished first in their group, but were also eliminated in the first round, losing 2–3 on aggregate to eventual champions Atlético Madrid. Trabzonspor did not qualify for the group stages.

The Turkey national football team did not qualify for the 2010 FIFA World Cup after finishing third in their group. On 17 February 2010, it was announced that Guus Hiddink would replace Fatih Terim at the helm of the national team.

Awards
Gol Kralı (Goal King)
Ariza Makukula (Kayserispor) – 21 goals

Honours

Final leagues tables

Süper Lig

1.Lig

Playoffs

2.Lig

Promotion group

Play-offs

3.Lig

Promotion group

Play-offs

National team

Friendlies

2010 FIFA World Cup qualifiers

References

 
Seasons in Turkish football
Turkish 2009